Delores Gauntlett (born 1949) is a Jamaican poet whose work has appeared in magazines, journals and anthologies.

Freeing her Hands to Clap was the 2000 National Book Development Council/Una Marson Biannual Award. Gauntlett's second book of poetry, The Watertank Revisited, was published in 2005.

References

20th-century Jamaican poets
1949 births
Living people
Jamaican women poets
20th-century Jamaican women writers